Rho Persei, Latinized from ρ Persei, is a star in the northern constellation of Perseus. It has the traditional name Gorgonea Tertia , being the third member of the quartet called the Gorgonea in reference to the Gorgons from the legend of Perseus. An apparent visual magnitude of +3.39 makes it visible to the naked eye, but a challenge to view from a well-lit urban environment.

Rho Persei is a semiregular variable star, whose apparent magnitude varies between 3.3 and 4.0 with periods of 50, 120 and 250 days. The star has reached the asymptotic giant branch of its evolution. It is a bright giant star with a stellar classification of M4 II. The outer envelope has an effective temperature of 3,479 K, giving it the red-orange hue of an M-type star.

This star has a mass 1.9 times the mass of the Sun, while its radius has expanded to 143 times solar. It is radiating some 2,700 times the Sun's luminosity. Rho Persei is losing mass at the rate of  solar masses per year, or the equivalent of the Sun's mass every 83 million years. It is about 440 million years in age.

Naming

References

External links
Gorgonea Tertia

M-type giants
Asymptotic-giant-branch stars
Semiregular variable stars
Zeta Herculis Moving Group

Perseus (constellation)
Persei, Rho
BD+38 0630
Persei, 25
019058
014354
0921
Gorgonea Tertia